The 1930 All-Southwest Conference football team consists of American football players chosen by various organizations for All-Southwest Conference teams for the 1930 college football season.  The selectors for the 1930 season included the Associated Press (AP).

All Southwest selections

Backs
 Jake Wilson, Baylor (AP-1 [QB])
 Dexter Shelley, Texas (AP-1 [HB])
 Harrison Stafford, Texas (AP-1 [HB])
 Ernie Koy, Texas (AP-1 [FB])

Ends
 Louis Long, SMU (AP-1)
 Adrian Tracy, Texas A&M (AP-1)

Tackles
 Ox Blanton, Texas (AP-1)
 Ben Boswell, TCU (AP-1)

Guards
 Barton Koch, Baylor (AP-1)
 Bill Morgan, Rice (AP-1)

Centers
 Noble Atkins, TCU (AP-1)

Key
AP = Associated Press

See also
 1930 College Football All-America Team

References

All-Southwest Conference
All-Southwest Conference football teams